The 1973 Sacramento State Hornets football team represented California State University, Sacramento as a member of the Far Western Conference (FWC) during the 1973 NCAA Division II football season. Led by 13th-year head coach Ray Clemons, Sacramento State compiled an overall record of 1–9 with a mark of 0–5 in conference play, placing last out of six teams in the FWC. The team was outscored by its opponents 186 to 106 for the season. The Hornets played home games at Hornet Stadium in Sacramento, California.

Schedule

References

Sacramento State
Sacramento State Hornets football seasons
Sacramento State Hornets football